MacLellan, McLellan, or variants thereof, is a surname of Scottish origin, some of whom emigrated to Ireland.  The name is an Anglicisation of the Scottish Gaelic Mac Gille Fhaolain (IPA: ˈmaʰkˈkʲiʎəˈɯːɫ̪ɪn), and the Irish Gaelic Mac Giolla Fhaoláin (IPA: ˈmˠakˈɟɪl̪ˠəˈiːl̪ˠaːnʲ), which meant "son of the servant of (Saint) Faolán". The personal name, Faolán, is thought to be a diminutive of faol, meaning "wolf" or "little wolf".

 Abigail McLellan (1969–2009), Scottish artist
 Adam McLellan (1865–1929), Australian politician
 Alan McLellan (born 1958), English cricketer
 Alasdair McLellan (born 1974), British photographer
 Alban MacLellan (1902–1968), Canadian railway foreman and politician from Alberta, Canada
 Alister McLellan (1919–2012), New Zealand mathematician and physicist
 Ally McLellan (1922–2010), footballer
 Angus MacLellan (born 1992), American rugby union player
 Anne McLellan (born 1950), Deputy Prime Minister of Canada under Paul Martin
 Andrew McLellan, Scots minister of religion and chairman of the McLellan Commission into safeguarding the Scottish Catholic Church
 Archibald McLelan, sixth Lieutenant Governor of Nova Scotia
 Archibald McLellan (1795–1854), Glasgow coachbuilder, magistrate, councillor, Deacon Convenor of the Glasgow Trades House, and art collector
 Bernard Donald McLellan (1859–1907), Canadian farmer and political figure in Prince Edward Island
 Brian MacLellan (born 1958), Canadian, professional ice hockey player
 Catherine MacLellan, Canadian folk singer-songwriter
 Charles Archibald MacLellan (1885–1961), 20th-century American painter and illustrator
 Daniel McLellan (born 1974), Australian surf swimmer and life saving competitor
 Dave McLellan, automotive engineer for General Motors
 David McLellan (Ontario politician) (1841–1892), mayor of Hamilton, Ontario, Canada
 David McLellan (political scientist) (born 1940), political scientist
 Eric McLellan (1916–2010), Archdeacon of Northern France
 Garreth McLellan (born 1982), Former South African professional mixed martial artist
 Gene MacLellan (1938–1995), Canadian, singer-songwriter
 Geoff MacLellan (born 1978), Canadian politician
 George B. McClellan (1826–1885), American Civil War military leader, Presidential candidate and Governor of New Jersey
 Gerald McLellan (1932–2009), Canadian ombudsman
 Hugh Dean McLellan (1876–1953), United States District Judge
 Isaac McLellan (1806–1899), American author and poet
 James MacLellan Brown (1886–1967), Scottish architect
 Jennifer McClellan (born 1972), Virginia politician
 Joasaph (McLellan) (1962–2009), US scholar and cleric, head of the ROCOR Russian Ecclesiastical Mission in Jerusalem
 Jock McLellan (1908–1974), New Zealand cricket umpire
 John M'Clellan (1609–1650) Scots Worthy, Presbyterian minister in who attempted to sail to America
 John Maclellan, 3rd Lord Kirkcudbright (died 1664), Scottish, baronet
 Jon MacLellan, computer game editor
 Joseph McLellan (1929–2005), music critic for The Washington Post
 Keith MacLellan (1920–1997), Canadian Diplomat
 Keith McLellan, Australian long jump and triple jump athlete and rugby league footballer
 Morag McLellan (born 1990), Scottish field hockey player
 Neil McLellan, producer, composer and mix engineer
 Patrick Maclellan of Bombie (died 1452), Scottish, Sheriff of Galloway
 Peter McLellan (1942–1999), Australian politician
 Richard D. McLellan, American lawyer
 Rob Maclellan (born 1934), Australian politician
 Robert Maclellan, 1st Lord Kirkcudbright (died 1641), Scottish, baronet
 Robert McLellan (1907–1985), Scots dramatist and poet
 Robert A. MacLellan (1882–1968), Canadian politician
 Robert F. McLellan (1914–1988), Canadian politician
 Roberto McLellan (born 1984), Canadian professional boxer
 Russell MacLellan (born 1940), Canadian, politician and Premier of Nova Scotia
 Sally McLellan, Australian track and field athlete
 Sandra McLellan (born 1961), Irish Sinn Féin TD
 Sarah McLellan (born 1982), Australian dancer, singer and actress
 Scott McLellan (born 1963), professional ice hockey player
 Silas McLellan (1897–1974), Canadian marathon runner
 Thomas Maclellan, 2nd Lord Kirkcudbright (died 1647), Scottish, baronet
 Thomas Maclellan of Bombie (died 1597), Scottish, Provost of Kirkcudbright
 Todd McLellan (born 1967), Canadian ice hockey player and head coach of the San Jose Sharks
 William Maclellan, 15th century Scottish noble
 William McLellan (American electrical engineer) (1928–2011), American electrical engineer
 William McLellan (Australian politician) (1831–1906), Australian politician
 William McLellan (Scottish electrical engineer) (1874–1934), Scottish electrical engineer
 William Walker McLellan (1873–1960), manager of the first S. H. Kress store in Memphis, Tennessee
 Yvette McLellan, Australian Paralympic athletics competitor
 Zoe McLellan (born 1974), American actress

See also 
MacLellan (disambiguation)
 David McLellan (disambiguation)
 Thomas Maclellan (disambiguation)
 William McLellan (disambiguation)

Notes

See also
 MacLelan

Scottish surnames
Anglicised Scottish Gaelic-language surnames